Precious Moments may refer to:

Precious Moments, Inc., a company that sells porcelain figurines.
 Also, the line of giftware sold by this company.
 Precious Moments (album), 1986 album by Jermaine Jackson
Precious Moments (1998), an album by The Sadies